Charles Edwin Johnson served as Acting United States Secretary of Health and Human Services from January to April 2009 during the Obama presidency.  Johnson was appointed by then President George W. Bush in 2005 as Assistant Secretary for Budget, Technology, and Finance. He was a public accountant for 31 years prior to joining the department.

References

External links 
Charles E. Johnson bio at HHS.gov (Archived by WebCite at https://web.archive.org/web/20090415200054/http://www.hhs.gov/about/bios/asrtbio.html
Presidential Nomination: Charles Edwin Johnson</ref>

Living people
American accountants
Brigham Young University alumni
George W. Bush administration personnel
Obama administration cabinet members
United States Department of Health and Human Services officials
1943 births